BOL entertainment launched its regular transmissions on 1 December 2018 with Pakistani dramas, sitcoms and soap operas.

Current Broadcast

Reality/Non-scripted
Aakhri Khiladi Kon?
Chatti Kay Bache Aapse Ache
Game Show Aisay Chalay Ga
Jeeto Ek Minute Main
Taxi Cash
The Insta Show
Tick Tock Show with Faheem Khan

Formerly Broadcast

Animated
Jan

Comedy
Aapko Kya Takleef Hai
Banglay Main Kanglay
Chana Jor Garam
Chatpata Chowk
Gol Guppay
Hansna Mana Hai
Ishq Mohalla
Jinn Ki Aayegi Baraat
Mirchiyaan
Upar Bhabhi Ka Makan
Yeh Hai Khatti Meethi Zindagi

Drama
Aik Mohabbat Kaafi Hai
Chakkar
Dilara
Kho Gaya Woh
Marham
Mohabbat Karna Mana Hai
Mohini Mansion Ki Cinderellayain
Siskiyan

Reality/Non-scripted
Bacha Log Game Show
BOL Nights
BOL House
Champions
Croron Mein Khel
Katakat Show
Khush Raho Pakistan
Pakh Pakh Pakao
Pakistan Star
Rabeeca Khan Show
Star Player
Star Rapper

Soap
Hum Usi Kay Hain
Parlour Wali Larki
Rabba Way
Tum Mujrim Ho

References

Lists of television series by network